Fitt is a surname. Notable people with the surname include:

 Alfred B. Fitt (1923–1992), United States lawyer
 Gerry Fitt (1926–2005), politician in Northern Ireland
 Lawton Fitt (born 1953), American banker
 Matthew Fitt, Lowland Scots/Lallans poet and novelist

The word can also be a technical term for a section of a long poem in medieval Germanic-language alliterative verse.